Giovanni Motisi (born 1 January 1959, in Palermo) also known as , is a member of the Sicilian Mafia in Sicily from the Altarello neighbourhood in Palermo. He has been on the most wanted list of the Italian ministry of the Interior since 1998.

Criminal background
He succeeded his uncle Matteo Motisi as head of the Motisi Mafia clan and boss of the mandamento of Pagliarelli. He is considered to be one of the more powerful bosses of Palermo. He rose in the ranks as one of the killers for Totò Riina and his Corleonesi, but became close to Bernardo Provenzano when the latter took over the position of Riina as head of Cosa Nostra. He is a fugitive since 1993 and is wanted for Mafia association and murder.

He received a life sentence for the murder of the police officer Beppe Montana on 28 July 1985. In March 2001, he escaped an attempt to arrest him. In 2002 he was replaced as the capo mandamento of the Pagliarelli neighbourhood by Antonio Rotolo when the latter left prison, because as a fugitive he did not manage the Mafia family sufficiently.

After the arrest of an older generation Mafia bosses – such as Bernardo Provenzano, Antonio Rotolo and Salvatore Lo Piccolo – in 2006 and 2007, Motisi, Pietro Tagliavia, Gianni Nicchi and Salvo Riina – the second-born son of boss of bosses Totò Riina – were considered to be the upcoming young Mafia bosses. However, the whereabouts of Motisi are unknown. According to some observers Motisi is dead, but the pentito Angelo Casano denies this and maintains that Motisi is hiding in Agrigento, in the south of Sicily.

See also
List of fugitives from justice who disappeared

References

External links
 Italian Ministry of the Interior wanted poster in PDF for Giovanni Motisi

1959 births
Fugitives
Fugitives wanted by Italy
Fugitives wanted on organised crime charges
Living people
Gangsters from Palermo
Motisi Mafia clan
Sicilian mafiosi